Eliezer E. Goldschmidt (born 1938, Jerusalem) is an emeritus professor of agriculture at the Hebrew University of Jerusalem. He earned his Ph.D. in 1968 and has been a professor since 1982.

Contributions
His research has focused on general agriculture and on various citrus species.

He is primarily known for his research on citron genetics and shape variability,. He developed an auxin which is instrumental in preserving the style and stigma of the citron; these features figure prominently in determining the halachic status of individual citrons for use as etrogim.

Since retiring from the Hebrew University, he has continued his work on projects to lengthen the shelf life of produce and to increase the productivity of wheat.

Selected publications

References

External links
 Hebrew University profile 
 Profile with links to scholarly work
 Differential Counteraction of Ethylene Effects by Gibberellin A3 and N6-Benzyladenine in Senescing Citrus Peel
 Fifty Years of Research, Hebrew

1938 births
Living people
Academic staff of the Hebrew University of Jerusalem
Israeli agronomists